North Carolina's 17th House district is one of 120 districts in the North Carolina House of Representatives. It has been represented by Republican Frank Iler since 2009.

Geography
Since 2005, the district has included part of Brunswick County. The district overlaps with the 8th Senate district.

District officeholders since 1983

Multi-member district

Single-member district

Election results

2022

2020

2018

2016

2014

2012

2010

2008

2006

2004

2002

2000

References

North Carolina House districts
Brunswick County, North Carolina